For other hills of the same name, see Y Garn (disambiguation).

Y Garn is a mountain in the southern Snowdonia, Wales, north of Dolgellau. It is an outlier of the Rhinogydd range, rising above the Coed-y-Brenin forest and the Rhaeadr Du waterfalls. An abandoned gold mine lies on its eastern slopes and Diffwys (750m) can be seen to the north from the summit.

References

Ganllwyd
Llanelltyd
Mountains and hills of Gwynedd
Mountains and hills of Snowdonia
Hewitts of Wales
Marilyns of Wales
Nuttalls